The College Valley is one of five cuttings into the Cheviot Hills. The valley is owned by College Valley Estates which in turn is funded by a trust created by Sir James Knott MP.

The valley is spectacularly beautiful and affords a serenely satisfying ascent of the Cheviot - 815 metres (2674 ft) - the highest peak in the area.

From north to south the estate is approximately 10 km and at its widest 7 km. There are over 105 km of roads and pathways criss crossing the College Valley.

The valley is open to the public, but access by car is restricted to permit holders only and these are limited on a daily basis.

Access
There is one road into the valley. This starts at Kirknewton on the road between Wooler and Kirk Yetholm. On entering the valley itself the road splits into two, the right hand turn to Trowup burn. The left hand fork goes to the estate office and farm there up the main valley to the Cheviot itself.

History
The valley is ringed by Bronze Age forts along the hill tops. There is evidence of habitation from very early times.

More recently the estate was owned by Cuthbert Collingwood, 1st Baron Collingwood, then the Grey family of Howick Hall followed by Arthur Sutherland.

Houses in the valley
The estate office is at Hethpool House, Kirknewton.
After this there are a number of estate cottages designed in the arts and crafts style.
Hethpool Mill is now converted into self-catering accommodation. There is evidence of habitation here back into the 13th century.

As the valley approaches the Cheviot itself it splits into two. The right hand fork going to Mounthooly which is now a YHA hostel. The left hand fork going up to Goldsceugh by way of Coldburn cottage and Dunsdale house.

Hills within the College Valley Estates
The Cheviot. 815m
The Schil. 600m.
Black Hag.549m.
Scald Hill. 546m
Newton Tors. 537m
Preston Hill.520m.
Broadhope Hill.516m
Saughieside Hill.487m
Coldburn Hill. 484m
Whitelaw Nick. 430m.
Loft Hill.410 m.
Madam Law.397m
Eccles cairn.350m.
Sinkside Hill.
Great Hetha.
White hill. 226m.

External links
The Times, Feb.27, 2010, article on College Valley
 College Valley Estate
 Northumbria byways - letting agents for cottages
 Panoramio. aerial topology and associated photographs
Dunsdale house on Geograph.org.uk
Cheviot hill forts
College Valley feature Length Documentary and DVD Postcards.

Cheviot Hills
Protected areas of Northumberland
Valleys of Northumberland